Sarrud-e Jonubi Rural District is a rural district (dehestan) in the Central District of Boyer-Ahmad County, Kohgiluyeh and Boyer-Ahmad Province, Iran. At the 2006 census, its population was 31,503, in 6,410 families. The rural district has 70 villages.

References 

Rural Districts of Kohgiluyeh and Boyer-Ahmad Province
Boyer-Ahmad County